Oktoberfest Zinzinnati is an annual weekend festival in the city of Cincinnati, Ohio. Based on the original German Oktoberfest, it is billed as the largest Oktoberfest celebration in the United States and second largest in the world. First held in 1976, it attracts an estimated 500,000 visitors every year in late September. It is held along six blocks of Downtown Cincinnati. As of 2016, Oktoberfest is held on 3rd Street to clear room for Cincinnati Streetcar operations.

Oktoberfest Zinzinnati claimed the world record for the largest Chicken Dance in 1994, with over 48,000 participants. It also boasts approximately 87,542 metts, 80,500 brats, 64,000 sauerkraut balls, 56,250 sausages, 24,640 potato pancakes, 20,000 cream puffs, 16,002 strudel, 6,000 jumbo pickles,  of sauerkraut,  of German potato salad,  of Limburger cheese, 700 pigtails, 400 pickled pigs feet, and 23,004 soft pretzels including giant  pretzels made by Servatii Pastry Shop.

No live concerts were held in 2020, but virtual ones were held because of the COVID-19 pandemic.

In both 2020 and 2021, Oktoberfest Zinzinnati was recognized as the world's largest Oktoberfest since Oktoberfest was canceled due to the COVID-19 pandemic two years in a row.

References

External links

Beer festivals in the United States
Festivals in Cincinnati
Oktoberfest
German-American culture in Cincinnati
September events
Cuisine of Cincinnati
1976 establishments in Ohio
Beer in Ohio
Festivals established in 1976